Durham Castle and Cathedral is a World Heritage Site (WHS ID No. 370).

The site includes Durham Castle, Durham Cathedral, Durham University, Palace Green and University College, Durham.

See also
List of World Heritage Sites in the United Kingdom

References

World Heritage Sites in England
Durham, England